The Maeldune Heritage Centre is in Maldon, Essex in England. It commemorates the Battle of Maldon. Its address is Maeldune Heritge Centre, Plume Building, Market Hill, Maldon, Essex, England. In it are the famous Maldon Millennium Embroidery, art displays, and Maldon Society historical displays . Its building was formerly St.Peter's Church, which had become redundant, as there are other churches in Maldon.

See also 
 Thomas Plume

External links
Maeldune Centre - visiting information
Small image
Map of area around Maldon

Buildings and structures in Essex
Museums in Essex
Textile museums in the United Kingdom
Local museums in Essex
Maldon, Essex